Carbon tetraiodide is a tetrahalomethane with the molecular formula CI4. Being bright red, it is a relatively rare example of a highly colored methane derivative. It is only 2.3% by weight carbon, although other methane derivatives are known with still less carbon.

Structure
The tetrahedral molecule features C-I distances of  2.12 ± 0.02 Å. The molecule is slightly crowded with short contacts between iodine atoms of 3.459 ± 0.03 Å, and possibly for this reason, it is thermally and photochemically unstable.

Carbon tetraiodide crystallizes in tetragonal crystal structure (a 6.409, c 9.558 (.10−1 nm)).

It has zero dipole moment due to its symmetrically substituted tetrahedral geometry.

Properties, synthesis, uses
Carbon tetraiodide is slightly reactive towards water, giving iodoform and I2. It is soluble in nonpolar organic solvents.  It decomposes thermally and photochemically to tetraiodoethylene, C2I4.  Its synthesis entails AlCl3-catalyzed halide exchange, which is conducted at room temperature:

CCl4  + 4 EtI -> CI4 +  4 EtCl
The product crystallizes from the reaction solution.

Carbon tetraiodide is used as an iodination reagent, often upon reaction with bases. Ketones are converted to 1,1-diiodoalkenes upon treatment with triphenylphosphine (PPh3) and carbon tetraiodide.  Alcohols are converted in and to iodide, by a mechanism similar to the Appel reaction. In an Appel reaction, carbon tetrachloride is used to generate alkyl chlorides from alcohols.

Safety considerations
Manufacturers recommend that carbon tetraiodide be stored near . As a ready source of iodine, it is an irritant.  Its LD50 on rats is 18 mg/kg. In general, perhalogenated organic compounds should be considered toxic, with the narrow exception of small perfluoroalkanes (essentially inert due to the strength of the C-F bond).

References

Further reading

Inorganic carbon compounds
Nonmetal halides
Iodoalkanes
Halomethanes
Reagents for organic chemistry